Saurauia lehmannii is a species of plant in the Actinidiaceae family. It is endemic to Ecuador.  Its natural habitats are subtropical or tropical moist lowland forests, subtropical or tropical moist montane forests, and subtropical or tropical high-altitude shrubland. It is threatened by habitat loss.

References

Endemic flora of Ecuador
lehmannii
Near threatened plants
Taxonomy articles created by Polbot